Union Sportive de Ouakam, also known simply as US Ouakam or USO, is a Senegalese basketball club based in the Ouakam subdivision of Dakar. The team competes in the Nationale 1, the highest national level.

Honours
Saint-Michel Cup
Winners (2): 2016, 2019

Notable players

Head coaches

References

Basketball teams in Senegal
Basketball teams established in 1951
1951 establishments in Senegal